Talking in Your Sleep (released on 5 May 1988) is an album from Swedish pop singer Lena Philipsson. It peaked at #10 at the Swedish album chart. On this album, she combines singing in Swedish and English.

Track listing
"Talking in Your Sleep" (music: Lena Philipsson, lyrics: Ingela Forsman)
"Säg, säg, säg" (music and lyrics: Torgny Söderberg)
"Ain't it Just the Way" (music: Lena Philipsson, lyrics: Ingela Forsman)
"The Key" (music and lyrics: Errol Starr and Eddie Schwartz)
"I varje spegel" (music: Torgny Söderberg, lyrics: Ingela Forsman)
"Never is a Long Time" (music and lyrics: Per Gessle)
"Om igen" (music: Bobby Ljunggren, Håkan Almqvist, lyrics: Ingela Forsman)
"Sommarnatt" (music: Lasse Andersson, lyrics: Ingela Forsman)
"Jag kan, jag vill" (music & text: Lena Philipsson)
"What Do You Know" (music: Anders Glenmark, lyrics: Ingela Forsman)
"I'm a Fool" (music and lyrics: Lena Philipsson)
"Vem skall sova över" (music and lyrics: Torgny Söderberg)
"Take it or Leave It" (music: Lasse Andersson, lyrics: Per Gessle)

Charts

References

1988 albums
Lena Philipsson albums